Los Alamos usually refers to Los Alamos, New Mexico.

Los Alamos may also refer to:

Establishments
Los Alamos National Laboratory
Los Alamos Laboratory, also known as Project Y, the war-time laboratory in Los Alamos, New Mexico.
Los Alamos Museum, unofficial name of the Bradbury Science Museum
Los Alamos Ranch School, boys' school

Places
 Los Alamos, California
 Los Álamos, Chile
 Los Alamos, New Mexico
 Los Alamos County, New Mexico
 Cañada de los Alamos, New Mexico

Media
Los Alamos, a novel by Joseph Kanon
Los Alamos, a book by the photographer William Eggleston

Other
Los Alamos chess, a chess variant
Los Alamos (AFDB-7), a former large floating dry dock
Los Álamos, a station on the Cercanías Málaga commuter rail service in Málaga, Spain